Cat and Mouse is a 2003 Hong Kong wuxia romantic comedy film directed by Gordon Chan, and starring Andy Lau, Anthony Wong and Cecilia Cheung. The film is loosely based on the 19th century novel, The Seven Heroes and Five Gallants by Shi Yukun.

Plot 
Zhan Zhao (Andy Lau) is a court officer who learns of a plot to assassinate Judge Bao (Anthony Wong). While on holiday he meets a young man named Bai (Cecilia Cheung) who turns out to be a woman.  Zhan Zhao tries to recruit Bai to help him stop the assassination of Judge Bao.

Cast

References

External links
 

2003 films
2003 martial arts films
2003 action comedy films
2003 romantic comedy films
Hong Kong action comedy films
Hong Kong martial arts comedy films
Hong Kong romantic comedy films
Wuxia films
2000s Cantonese-language films
Media Asia films
Basic Pictures films
Films directed by Gordon Chan
Films based on The Seven Heroes and Five Gallants
Fictional depictions of Bao Zheng in film
Cross-dressing in film
2000s Hong Kong films